Dar Chioukh is a town and commune in Djelfa Province, Algeria. According to the 2008 census it has a population of 26,605. It is located northeast of Djelfa and north by a smaller road from the N46 from M'Liliha.

References

Communes of Djelfa Province
Djelfa Province